The Corra White Harris House, Study, and Chapel, also known as In the Valley, is a hilltop complex located in Rydal, Georgia.

It was home of Corra White Harris, a writer made famous by her 1910 book A Circuit Rider's Wife, which eventually became the 1951 film I'd Climb the Highest Mountain.  She purchased the property in 1913 and died in 1935.

In 1916, she wrote "In the Valley,", published in The Independent 87, pp. 123–124.  She wrote about it in numerous other pieces, including in the follow articles with "Valley" in their titles:
 (1914). "New York as Seen from a Georgia Valley: In the Valley," The Independent 77, pp. 97–99.
 (1914). "The Valley: After New York," The Independent 79, pp. 63–65.
 (1915). "From the Peace Zone in the Valley," The Independent 81, pp. 190–192.
 (1916). "Politics and Prayers in the Valley," The Independent 87, pp. 135–136.
 (1917). "War Time in the Valley," The Independent 91, p. 471.

The center part of the house was reportedly built  1830 by Pine Log, a Cherokee chieftain.

The complex was listed on the National Register of Historic Places  in 1997.  A  area is listed with five contributing buildings and one other contributing structure.

References

External links 
 In the Valley Collection (Corra Harris Historic Homestead, Bartow County, Georgia), 1902–2004, from the Kennesaw State University Archives.

Houses on the National Register of Historic Places in Georgia (U.S. state)
Houses in Bartow County, Georgia
National Register of Historic Places in Bartow County, Georgia